The tables below provide statistics on the human Y-chromosome DNA haplogroups most commonly found among ethnolinguistic groups and populations from East and South-East Asia.

ST means Sino-Tibetan languages.

Main table

Austronesian and Tai-Kadai
The following is a table of Y-chromosome DNA haplogroup frequencies of Austro-Tai peoples (i.e., Tai-Kadai peoples and Austronesian peoples).

Tibeto-Burman branch of Sino-Tibetan
The following table of Y-chromosome DNA haplogroup frequencies of Tibeto-Burman-speaking peoples of western and southwestern China is from Wen, et al. (2004).

See also
Y-DNA haplogroups by group
Y-DNA haplogroups in populations of South Asia
Y-DNA haplogroups in populations of Central and North Asia
Y-DNA haplogroups in populations of Oceania
Y-DNA haplogroups in populations of the Near East
Y-DNA haplogroups in populations of North Africa
Y-DNA haplogroups in populations of Europe
Y-DNA haplogroups in populations of the Caucasus
Y-DNA haplogroups in populations of Sub-Saharan Africa
Y-DNA haplogroups in indigenous peoples of the Americas
Far East
East Asian languages
Classification schemes for Southeast Asian languages
Ethnic groups in Asia
Ethnic groups of Southeast Asia

Notes

References

External links
Y-DNA Ethnographic and Genographic Atlas and Open-Source Data Compilation

Asia East And Southeast